Deepwater Horizon oil spill consequences may refer to:

 Economic effects of the Deepwater Horizon oil spill
 Environmental impact of the Deepwater Horizon oil spill
 Health consequences of the Deepwater Horizon oil spill
 Reactions to the Deepwater Horizon oil spill